Saad or Sa'ad may also refer to:

 Saad (letter), a letter in the Arabic script

Saad (name), people carrying the name or surname
Sa'ad, a kibbutz in the Negev desert in Israel
Saad Esporte Clube, a Brazilian football club
 Saad SC, an Iraqi football club
Saad Specialist Hospital, in Khobar, Saudi Arabia
Saad National Schools, in Khobar, Saudi Arabia 
Kolej Yayasan Saad, formerly Saad Foundation College, a school in Malaysia 
, a Pakistan Navy submarine

See also
Sa'd al-Din (disambiguation), including variants such as Saadeddine
Saadallah, a  given name and family name
Banu Sa'ad, one of the tribes of Arabia during Muhammad's era
 System Administrator Appreciation Day